Bertold Mainka (born 4 June 1934) is a Polish rower. He competed in the men's coxed pair event at the 1956 Summer Olympics.

References

1934 births
Living people
Polish male rowers
Olympic rowers of Poland
Rowers at the 1956 Summer Olympics
Sportspeople from Zabrze